Macrobrochis tibetensis is a moth of the family Erebidae. It was described by Fang in 1990. It is found in Xizang, China.

References

Lithosiina
Moths described in 1990